Şahsoltanlı (also, Shakhsoltanly) is a village and municipality in the Goychay Rayon of Azerbaijan.  It has a population of 991.

References 

Populated places in Goychay District